Prince William of Gloucester Barracks is a military installation near Grantham in Lincolnshire.

History
The barracks were established, on the site of the former RAF Spitalgate airbase, in October 1976, as the new Central Volunteer Headquarters for the Royal Corps of Transport. The barracks were formally named after Prince William of Gloucester at a ceremony held in March 1977 led by Princess Alice, Duchess of Gloucester. The Central Volunteer Headquarters were renamed the Royal Corps of Transport Territorial Army Depot and Training Centre in 1979. The facility provided centralised training for all volunteer members of the Royal Corps of Transport. In 1982 the first holder of the new post of Commander Royal Corps of Transport Territorial Army ('Commander RCT TA') moved into the barracks. In the 1980s the barracks also served as home to 54th Infantry Brigade.

The barracks remain the home of Headquarters Royal Logistic Corps Army Reserve and of the Army Training Regiment (Grantham) which provides phase one training to Army Reserve Recruits. It is also the base for the Regional Training Centre of 7th Infantry Brigade and Headquarters East and Regimental Headquarters for the Queen's Royal Lancers.

In September 2016 it was announced that the barracks were to be sold by the Ministry of Defence. In November 2016 the Ministry of Defence announced that the site would close in 2020. This was later extended to 2024, and once more to 2028.

Current units
Current units based at the camp include:
Headquarters, 102nd Logistic Brigade
167 Catering Support Regiment, Royal Logistic Corps
294 (Grantham) Supply Squadron, 159 Regiment, Royal Logistic Corps
2 Operational Support Group, Royal Logistic Corps
Regimental Headquarters, Royal Lancers
Army Training Regiment Grantham

References

Installations of the British Army
Barracks in England